Cain Creek is a stream in the U.S. state of South Dakota.

History
Cain Creek has the name of John Cain, an early settler.

See also
List of rivers of South Dakota

References

Rivers of Beadle County, South Dakota
Rivers of Hand County, South Dakota
Rivers of South Dakota